Holland Sackett Duell (January 29, 1881 in Syracuse, Onondaga County, New York – November 25, 1942 in Larchmont, Westchester County, New York) was an American lawyer, US Army officer and politician from New York.

Life
He was the son of Judge Charles Holland Duell (1850–1920) and Harriet M. (Sackett) Duell. He graduated B.A. from Yale College in 1902, and LL.B. from New York Law School in 1904. He was admitted to the bar, and practiced in New York City, specializing in patent law. On September 29, 1904, he married Mabel Halliwell (born 1882), and they had five children; among them Charles Halliwell Duell (born 1905), one of the founders of the Duell, Sloan and Pearce publishing house.

Duell was a member of the New York State Assembly (Westchester Co., 2nd D.) in 1907 and  1909; and was Chairman of the Committee on Federal Relations in 1909.

In the waning days of World War I, he fought as a major with the 306th Field Artillery, 77th Division, American Expeditionary Forces (July 18, 1918 - November 11, 1918). During that brief period he was awarded both the Distinguished Service Medal and the Distinguished Service Cross for "extraordinary heroism in combat", and further received the Croix de Guerre from the Republic of France. Upon discharge following the end of the war, he received a (retirement) promotion to lieutenant colonel.

He was a member of the New York State Senate (26th D.) in 1921 and 1922, and was Chairman of the Committee on Labor and Industries.

On August 25, 1925, he and his wife Mabel were divorced; and on September 1, 1925, he married Emilie Brown (1884–1965).

He died on November 25, 1942, at his home in Larchmont, New York, after a brief illness; and was buried at the Arlington National Cemetery.

Sources
 COL. DUELL WEDS; REVEALS DIVORCE in NYT on September 2, 1925
 HOLLAND S. DUELL, ATTORNEY, SOLDIER in NYT on November 26, 1942 (subscription required)
 Sackett family
 "Ardenwold", images of his house, and family; his portrait, and obit

External links
 

1881 births
1942 deaths
Republican Party New York (state) state senators
Lawyers from Syracuse, New York
People from Larchmont, New York
Recipients of the Distinguished Service Cross (United States)
Recipients of the Distinguished Service Medal (US Army)
Recipients of the Croix de Guerre 1914–1918 (France)
Burials at Arlington National Cemetery
United States Army officers
Yale College alumni
New York Law School alumni
Republican Party members of the New York State Assembly
20th-century American politicians
Politicians from Syracuse, New York
Military personnel from Syracuse, New York
20th-century American lawyers